Riga Shipyard is  a Latvian shipyard as well as one of the largest shipyards in the Baltic region. The shipyard has 9 berths, 3 docks and 2 slipways on the banks of Daugava river channels. The yard is capable to accommodate Panamax size vessels for dry-docking and Aframax size vessels for afloat repairs. Riga Shipyard has repaired more than 100 seagoing vessels per year and has built more than 150 hulls, some partially outfitted, since 1997. Established in 1913, the enterprise was torn by both world wars, which was revived both times. Riga shipyard was privatized in 1995.

According to press, in 2013 suffered €1.6 mln losses in 2013 and €1.5 mln in 2014, almost going bankrupt in 2014. In 2020 Latvia's Financial and Capital Markets Commission (FKTK) fined the shipyard for violation of the Financial Instruments Market Law. According to the FKTK, the shipyard didn't provide audited financial statements for 2018 and interim financial statements for the first nine months of 2019. The shipyard was ordered to immediately provide all the necessary documents.

See also
 Baltic Workboats

References

External links
 

Shipbuilding companies of Latvia
Manufacturing companies based in Riga
Military vehicle manufacturers
Defence companies of Latvia
Shipbuilding companies of the Soviet Union
Companies nationalised by the Soviet Union
Manufacturing companies established in 1913
1913 establishments in the Russian Empire
Companies listed on Nasdaq Riga